Events in the year 1951 in Egypt.

Births 
 9 January, Ahmed Seif El-Islam, Egyptian Activist.
 26 January, Mohamed Orabi, former Foreign Minister of Egypt. 
 23 May, Hisham Bastawisy, Egyptian judge and the vice president of the Egyptian Court of Cassation.
 8 August, Mohamed Morsi,  the fifth president of Egypt.
 15 October, Abdel Moneim Aboul Fotouh, Egyptian physician.

Deaths 
 30  April, Nabawiyya Musa,  Egyptian Nationalist and Feminist.

 
Years of the 20th century in Egypt
Egypt
Egypt